Chamkar Mon (meaning 'Mulberry Farm') is the southernmost district in central Phnom Penh, Cambodia. The district has an area of 10.56 km2. As of the 2019 census, its population is 70,772.

Administration 
Chamkar Mon was subdivided into 12 Sangkats and 95 Phums (villages).
On January 8, 2019, according to sub-decree 03 អនក្រ.បក, 7 sangkats from Khan Chamkar Mon have been moved to a new khan, Khan Boeng Keng Kang.

Cityscape

Places of interest
Naga World
Phsar Tuol Tompoung Market (Russian Market)
Tuol Sleng Genocide Museum
Wat Tuol Tompoung

Education
Canadian International School of Phnom Penh maintains the main campus on Koh Pich in Chamkar Mon Section and the Bassac Garden Preschool in the Chamkar Mon Section.

iCan British International School is in Tonle Bassac commune.

References

Districts of Phnom Penh